The 1899 Sewanee Tigers baseball team represented the Sewanee Tigers baseball team of the University of the South in the 1899 college baseball season.  The Tigers were led by coach Henry Ashford and finished in first place in the Southern Intercollegiate Athletic Association with a record of 4–0, 7–0 overall.

Personnel

Players

Staff

Schedule and results

References

Sewanee
Sewanee Tigers baseball seasons
Southern Intercollegiate Athletic Association baseball champion seasons
1899 in sports in Tennessee